G40, G-40 or G.40 may refer to:

Transportation  
 G40 Shanghai–Xi'an Expressway in China
 a model of the Volkswagen Polo automobile

Military  
 Gloster E.28/39, also known as the Gloster G.40, a United Kingdom jet developed during World War II
 SMS G40, an Imperial German Navy torpedo boat

Other 
 Generation 40, a Zimbabwean political faction in ZANU-PF supporting Grace Mugabe, the wife of Robert Mugabe
 IBM ThinkPad G40, a laptop computer